Kálmán Egri (25 November 1902 – 20 September 1968) was a Hungarian athlete. He competed in the men's discus throw at the 1928 Summer Olympics.

References

External links
 

1902 births
1968 deaths
Athletes (track and field) at the 1928 Summer Olympics
Hungarian male discus throwers
Olympic athletes of Hungary
Place of birth missing
20th-century Hungarian people